Ernest L. Ruddy (1 November 1870 - November 24, 1954) was an American-Canadian advertising magnate and the founder of E. L. Ruddy & Co and the Regent Theatre Company.

Early life and education 
Ernest L. Ruddy was born on 1 November 1870 in Holyoke, Massachusetts.

Career 
He worked in the print department of the Los Angeles Times, before relocating to Canada in 1894. He founded the Connor-Ruddy Company in 1904 or 1905, which became the E. L. Ruddy & Co in 1912, following the merger of Connor-Ruddy Company's activities with those of the Canadian sign-writer Walter Sutton. Ruddy was the president of the Outdoor Advertising Association of America from 1914 to 1915. In 1916, Ruddy and sales agent Nathan L. Nathanson supported the creation of the Regent Theatre Company, which took over the existing Majestic Theatre in Toronto and turned it into the Regent Theatre based on architectural design work by Thomas W. Lamb. The company gained the exclusive rights to show Paramount Films in Canada.

Death 
Ruddy died in Toronto on November 24, 1954 aged 84.

References 

1870 births
1954 deaths
American emigrants to Canada
American company founders
Canadian company founders
Media founders
Los Angeles Times people